Armend is an Albanian male given name meaning "golden mind". Notable people with this name include:

Armend Alimi (born 1987), Macedonian football player
Armend Dallku (born 1983), Albanian football coach and player
Armend Kabashi (born 1995), Finnish football player
Armend Thaqi (born 1992), Kosovan football player

Albanian masculine given names